Yeung Yiu-chung, BBS, JP (born 1951 in Hong Kong) is a Hong Kong pro-Beijing educator and politician. He is the President of the Hong Kong Federation of Education Workers and the Hong Kong Deputy to National People's Congress of the People's Republic of China. He is also the member of The Democratic Alliance for the Betterment and Progress of Hong Kong. He now works as the Principal of Heung To School (Tin Shui Wai) in Tin Shui Wai, Yuen Long. He was a member of Legislative Council of Hong Kong from 1998 to 2004.

Yeung is a director of the Hong Kong Government funded National Education Services Centre, a private corporation promoting teaching materials on national culture to schools in Hong Kong which have attracted much criticism for their pro-Beijing bias.

Link
Official website of Yeung Yiu-chung

References

1951 births
Living people
Alumni of the Chinese University of Hong Kong
Hong Kong educators
Delegates to the 9th National People's Congress from Hong Kong
Delegates to the 10th National People's Congress from Hong Kong
Delegates to the 11th National People's Congress from Hong Kong
Delegates to the 12th National People's Congress from Hong Kong
Democratic Alliance for the Betterment and Progress of Hong Kong politicians
Members of the Selection Committee of Hong Kong
Members of the Provisional Legislative Council
HK LegCo Members 1998–2000
HK LegCo Members 2000–2004
Hong Kong Affairs Advisors